"Oh, Beautiful Virgin Islands" is the official territorial song of the British Virgin Islands (often called the BVI). The song was composed by brother and sister team Kareem Nelson Hull and Ayana Hull, both Virgin Islanders. It was adopted as the territorial song by resolution of the House of Assembly of the Virgin Islands on 24 July 2012. As a British Overseas Territory, the Virgin Islands retains "God Save the King" as its official national anthem.

History
The Virgin Islands Minister for Education and Culture, Myron Walwyn, announced in December 2011 that the VI government would hold a "Territorial Song and Dress Competition". Walwyn explained that his government wished to adopt a "territorial song and dress that embodies who we are as a people" and that would "infuse Virgin Islands pride and provide a greater sense of identity". The minister acknowledged that the former government had begun a similar process in 2005. The minister added that the "new process will allow for entries from a wider base and give previous submissions the opportunity to redefine and submit their work".

Former Culture Minister, Ms. Eileene L. Parsons was chosen to spearhead the ad hoc Committee on Territorial Dress and Song. The other committee members were Mrs. Sheila Brathwaite, Dr. Charles Wheatley, Mrs. Delores Christopher and the Acting Director of Culture, Mrs. Brenda Lettsome-Tye. Twenty-four submissions were received for the Territorial Song Competition. Ultimately, three songs were chosen as the finalists: "Virgin Islands, Land I Love", "Wonder of Creation: The Beautiful Virgin Islands" and the winning song.  Members of the public were then invited to vote online for their preferred song.

An open presentation of the finalists for the Territorial Song and Dress Competition was hosted by the government on Sunday, 10 June 2012, at a celebration entitled "Defining Ourselves: A Virgin Islands Story in Dress and Song." The presentation was held at the Eileen L. Parsons Auditorium (named in honour of the Chairlady of the Territorial Song and Dress Committee) of the H. Lavity Stoutt Community College at 3pm. The Premier and the Culture Minister both delivered separate remarks at the Presentation. During the Presentation, the three finalist songs were performed. Although, the winning song was originally composed with the name "Oh, Beautiful Virgin Islands" it has frequently been performed as "Oh, British Virgin Islands". On the day of the Presentation, it was indeed performed as "Oh, British Virgin Islands".

Following a robust debate in the House of Assembly, the winning song received 10 votes out of a possible 13 votes from the elected members. Two Opposition members were absent while the former Culture Minister, the Hon. Andrew Fahie abstained based on the process that was being used. By that resolution (as rectified by the resolution below), the territorial song was chosen. The following is the text of the resolution (which also approved the official Territorial dress):

Other symbols
The adoption of the territorial song was followed in 2016 by the adoption of a territorial pledge. The Virgin Islands pledge is now recited by school children in the territory on every school days. Its adoption was intended as another Government initiative aimed at instilling 'Virgin Islands pride'.

Lyrics

References

Public Invited To Presentation Of Territorial Song And Dress Caribseek News.  Retrieved on 26 August 2012.
Welcome to the BVI London Office Website BVI London Office.  Retrieved on 26 August 2012.

British Virgin Islands culture
British Virgin Islands songs
National anthems
British anthems
North American anthems
2012 in the British Virgin Islands